Austin Bernicke (died 13 January 1977) was a Nauruan politician. He was a member of the first Local Government Council in 1951, then a member of Parliament after it was established in 1966, serving until his death in 1977. He also served as a cabinet minister from 1968 until 1976.

Biography
Bernicke became the first Nauruan to attend university when he began studying medicine at Queen's College at the University of Melbourne. He returned to Nauru to work as a pathologist, later becoming superintendent of Nauru Hospital. Bernicke contested the first elections to the Local Government Council in 1951 and was elected from the Denigomodu, Nibok, Uaboe and Baiti constituency. He later became the council's secretary.

In 1966 Bernicke was elected to the new  Legislative Council in the Buada Constituency. He was also elected to the Constitutional Convention the following year and was elected Deputy Chairman of the body. After being re-elected to a renamed Legislative Assembly in 1968, he was nominated as a candidate for the presidency, but declined. However, he was elected to the Council of State, becoming Minister for Health and Education. The Legislative Assembly became Parliament upon independence later in the year.

Bernicke was re-elected in 1971 and 1973, retaining his ministerial portfolio following both elections. Although he was re-elected again in 1976, he was excluded from the new cabinet. He died in January 1977. His grandson Shadlog Bernicke later became an MP.

References

University of Melbourne alumni
Pathologists
Members of the Parliament of Nauru
Government ministers of Nauru
1977 deaths
Nauruan physicians
20th-century Nauruan politicians